The Allgemeine Deutsche Zeitung für Rumänien (ADZ) is a German-language daily newspaper based in Romania.

History 

The ADZ was first published in 1993. Apart from its head office in Bucharest, the newspaper also has local offices in Sibiu/Hermannstadt, Brașov/Kronstadt, Reșița/Reschitza, Satu Mare/Neumarkt and Timișoara/Temeschwar.

It is currently the only German-language daily newspaper published in Eastern Europe.

References

External links 
 Homepage of the ADZ

German-language newspapers published in Romania
Newspapers published in Bucharest
1993 establishments in Romania